Celine in Las Vegas: Opening Night Live is a one-off American television special by the Canadian singer Celine Dion that was broadcast by CBS on 25 March 2003 and was recorded at the 4,000-seat Colosseum at Caesars Palace in Las Vegas, Nevada, the very same day. Hosted by Justin Timberlake, the special celebrated the Opening Night performance of Dion's first Las Vegas residency "A New Day..." which initially ran for 3 years being extended for an additional 2 years in Las Vegas. It was also promotion for Dion's studio album, One Heart. The special featured only 8 performances of songs from the original setlist of "A New Day...". The special also featured backstage footage and a Behind the Scenes featurette at the making of "A New Day...".

The full show would later be filmed for the Live in Las Vegas: A New Day... DVD and Blu-Ray in 2007 during the show's 5th and final year.

Set list
 "The Power of Love"
 "I'm Alive"
 "I've Got The World On A String"
 "The First Time Ever I Saw Your Face" 
 "I Wish" 
 "I Drove All Night" 
 "What a Wonderful World"
 "Love Can Move Mountains"

References

Celine Dion
Caesars Palace